The sixty-ninth Minnesota Legislature first convened on January 7, 1975. The 67 members of the Minnesota Senate were elected during the General Election of November 7, 1972, while the 134 members of the Minnesota House of Representatives were elected during the General Election of November 5, 1974. The sixty-ninth Legislature was the first Minnesota Legislature to sit after the repeal of the requirement that Minnesota legislators be chosen in legally nonpartisan elections.

Sessions 
The legislature met in a regular session from January 7, 1975 to May 19, 1975. A continuation of the regular session was held between January 27, 1976 and April 7, 1976. There were no special sessions of the 69th Legislature.

Party summary 
Resignations and new members are discussed in the "Membership changes" section, below.

Senate

House of Representatives

Leadership

Senate 
President of the Senate
Alec G. Olson (DFL-Spicer)

Senate Majority Leader
Nicholas D. Coleman (DFL-Saint Paul)

Senate Minority Leader
Robert O. Ashbach (R-Saint Paul)

House of Representatives 
Speaker of the House
Martin O. Sabo (DFL-Minneapolis)

House Majority Leader
Irvin N. Anderson (DFL-International Falls)

House Minority Leader
Henry J. Savelkoul (R-Albert Lea)

Members

Senate

House of Representatives

Membership changes

Senate

References 

 Minnesota Legislators Past & Present - Session Search Results (Session 69, Senate)
 Minnesota Legislators Past & Present - Session Search Results (Session 69, House)

69th
1970s in Minnesota
1975 in Minnesota
1976 in Minnesota
1975 U.S. legislative sessions
1976 U.S. legislative sessions